Japan has a nationwide Tsunami Warning system . The system usually issues the warning minutes after an Earthquake Early Warning (EEW) is issued, should there be expected waves. The tsunami warning was issued within 3 minutes with the most serious rating on its warning scale during the 2011 Tōhoku earthquake and tsunami; it was rated as a "major tsunami", being at least 3 m (9.8 ft) high. An improved system was unveiled on March 7, 2013 following the 2011 disaster to better assess imminent tsunamis.

Overview 
When an earthquake occurs, the Japan Meteorological Agency (JMA) estimates the possibility of tsunami generation from seismic observation data. If disastrous waves are expected in coastal regions, JMA issues a Tsunami Warning/Advisory for each region expected to be affected based on estimated tsunami heights. JMA also issues information on tsunami details such as estimated arrival times and heights. After an earthquake occurs, JMA issues Tsunami Warnings/Advisories and Tsunami Information bulletins if a tsunami strike is expected. Major Tsunami Warnings are issued in the classification of Emergency Warnings as of 30 August, 2013.

Tsunami Warning / Advisory 
When an earthquake occurs that could generate a disastrous tsunami in coastal regions of Japan, JMA issues Major Tsunami Warnings, Tsunami Warnings and/or Tsunami Advisories for individual regions based on estimated tsunami heights around three minutes after the quake (or as early as two minutes in some cases).

Immediately after an earthquake occurs, JMA promptly establishes its location, magnitude and the related tsunami risk. However, it takes time to determine the exact scale of earthquakes with a magnitude of 8 or more. In such cases, JMA issues an initial warning based on the predefined maximum magnitude to avoid underestimation.

When such values are used, estimated maximum tsunami heights are expressed in qualitative terms such as "Huge" and "High" in initial warnings rather than as quantitative expressions. Once the exact magnitude is determined, JMA updates the warning with estimated maximum tsunami heights expressed in quantitative terms.

Major Tsunami Warnings are issued in the classification of Emergency Warnings. Detailed information on Emergency Warnings is provided on the Emergency Warning System article.

See also 
 Emergency Warning System

References

Note

External links 
Tsunami Warning / Advisory - JMA

Warning systems
Warning system
Japan Meteorological Agency